The DS2000 is a geostationary communications satellite bus designed and manufactured by Mitsubishi Electric of Japan. It is compatible with Ariane 5, Proton-M, Zenit-3SL, Atlas V, Falcon 9 and H-IIA.

According to Moog-ISP, the DS2000 platform uses its bipropellant thrusters.

List of satellites
Satellites using the DS2000 platform.

See also
 A2100 – Similar satellite bus made by Lockheed Martin Space Systems and popular with Japanese satellite operators
 SSL 1300 – Another comparable satellite bus used by Japanese satellite operators and made by SSL

References

External links
 MELCO DS2000 page

Communications satellites
Mitsubishi Electric
Satellite buses
Satellites of Japan